Mar Aprem Mooken (born George Mooken) is the Metropolitan of the Assyrian Church of the East in India (Chaldean Syrian Church).

Early life 

George Mooken was born on 13 June 1940 in Thrissur, Kingdom of Cochin, British India. Educated in India, England, and America, he specialized in Church History. He served as President of the Church History Association of India between 1976 and 1982. He studied at Leonard Theological College, Jabalpur for B.D.

George Mooken gained master's degrees in Church History from both the United Theological College, Bangalore (1966) and the Union Theological Seminary, New York (1967). He was ordained a deacon on 25 June 1961, and a priest four years later on 13 June 1965. He was consecrated Bishop on 21 September 1968, by Mar Thoma Darmo, Catholicos Patriarch of the Ancient Church of the East, taking the name Mar Aprem Mooken, and promoted as a Metropolitan of the Ancient Church of the East eight days later in Baghdad. Then later, in 1999, Mooken rejoined the Assyrian Church of the East. He was instrumental in healing the rift that had developed in the church over the question of hereditary appointments since the 1960s.

Publications 
Mar Aprem is the author of 65 books on topics which include church history, theology, social issues, and humour.

Selected works

Biographies

Church History

 
 
 
 
Sacraments of the Church of the East. 1978.
Nestorian Theology. 1978.
Nestorian Lectionary & Julian Calendar. 1982.
Western Missions Among Assyrians. 1982.
A Nestorian Bibliography. 1982.
 
 
Good News Festivals in India. 1984.
Indian Christian Directory. 1984.
Mar Aprem, Theologian & Poet. 1990.
 
Lectures on Indian Church History. 2007.

Travelogues

America Revisited, 1977.
Germany via Vienna: A Travelogue. 1980.
From Baghdad to Chicago: A Travelogue. 1985.
Australian Assyrians. 1988.
Belgium and Holland via U.K. & U.S.A.: A Travelogue. 1989.
Sydney to Canberra: A Travelogue. 1989.
The Assyrians in Iraq. 1989.
Washington New York: A Travelogue. 1992.
London to Moscow: A Travelogue. 1994.
Los Angeles to Tokyo: A Travelogue. 1993.
Oxford to Austria: A Travelogue. 1995.
Salzburg to Boston: A Travelogue. 1995.
Israel, Scandinavia & U.S.A.: A Travelogue. 1996.
Hassake to Hollywood: A Travelogue. 1998.
Italy, Liban & Iran: A Travelogue. 1998.
To U.K. Via U.S.A.: A Travelogue. 1999.
USA, Canada, Europe & Thailand: A Travelogue. 2000.
Austria to Australia: A Travelogue. 2001.
India to Indiana: A Travelogue. 2002.
Two Trips in 2002: A Travelogue. 2003.
Budapest to Rugby: A Travelogue. 2003.
UAE via U.K. and USA: A Travelogue. 2005.
Sharjah, Qatar & Brazil: A Travelogue. 2006.
Wiesbaden to Moscow: A Travelogue. 2007.
Dubai to Duhok: A Travelogue. 2009.
Sydney, Melbourne & Perth: A Travelogue. 2009.
Chicago via Abu Dhabi: A Travelogue. 2010.
Los Angeles to Dubai: A Travelogue. 2012.
Rugby to Rome: A Travelogue. 2012.
14th Holy Synod & Sir Baniyas Monastery: A Travelogue. 2013.
Muscat and Sri Lanka: A Travelogue. 2014.

Humour

Bishop's Jokes. 3rd ed., Bombay: Light of Life Magazine. 1983.
Laugh with the Bishop. 8th ed., Bombay: St.Paul's. 1988.
Laugh to Health. Madras: C.L.S.. 1992.
Holy Humour. 1993.
Joy to the World. 1994.
Holy Smile. 1997.
Not So Funny. 2004.

Malayalam

An Introduction to the History of the Eastern Churches. 1976.
Christeeya Bhakti Ganangal. 1985.
Sabha Charitra Dictionary. 1985.
Christuvinte Kalpadukalilude: A Travelogue. 1985.

General

From Relief to Development. 1979.
Teach Yourself Aramaic. 1981.
Behold the Cross of Calvary. 1987.
Sermons From the Gospels [Vol. I] from Advent to Pentecost. 1988.
Sermons From the Gospels [Vol. II]. 1988.
The Nestorian Canon Law. 1990.
Mesopotamia Light. 1993.
Voices of the East. 1998.
Mother of the Motherless. 2002.
Poems and Prayers. 2002.

Assyrian Manuscripts in India. 2011.

See also
Assyrian Church of the East
Ancient Church of the East
Chaldean Syrian Church

Notes

References
 In Depth Biography Aprem Mooken

External links
Documentary:'Humour, Music, Scholastic Divinity: A Day in the Life of His Grace Mar Aprem Metropolitan of Malabar and India Assyrian Church of the East'

Living people
1940 births
21st-century bishops of the Assyrian Church of the East
Church of the East in India
Christian clergy from Thrissur
Senate of Serampore College (University) alumni
St. Thomas College, Thrissur alumni
Leonard Theological College alumni